Central Female College, was a women's college  located in Lexington, Missouri.  The institution was associated with the Methodist Episcopal Church, South and operated from 1869 to 1924.

Early history

The college was initially founded as Marvin Female Institute in honor of Bishop Enoch Mather Marvin and was located on South 6th Street.  The institution moved to the property of the former Masonic College in 1871 and adopted the name of Central Female College.

Along with seven other women's colleges in Missouri – Stephens, Christian, Lindenwood, Cottey, Howard Payne, William Woods, and Hardin College and Conservatory of Music – Central Female College was one of the original members of Phi Theta Kappa, the international honor society for two-year colleges and program.

Early Presidents
William F. Camp
J.O. Church
W.T.J. Sullivan
M.G. McIlhaney
Wesley G. Miller
William F. Kerdolff, Jr.
A.A. Jones
Zachariah M. Williams

Later years
After closing, the assets were acquired by Central College, now Central Methodist University in Fayette, Missouri.

See also
 List of current and historical women's universities and colleges in the United States

References

Williams, Walter.  The State of Missouri An Autobiography.  Columbia, MO: Press of W.E. Stephens, 1904, p. 208.

External links
 Brown, Ray C.List of Missouri Colleges that Closed, Merged, or Changed Names

Defunct private universities and colleges in Missouri
Buildings and structures in Lafayette County, Missouri
Women in Missouri